Evgeniy Gabrilovich is a research director at Facebook Reality Labs where he conducts research on neuromotor interfaces. Prior to that he was a  Principal Scientist/Director at Google, specializing in Information Retrieval, Machine Learning, and Computational Linguistics, and a Fellow of the Institute of Electrical and Electronics Engineers (IEEE), and an ACM Fellow. In 2010, he received the Karen Spärck Jones Award from the British Computer Society Information Retrieval Specialist Group.

Career 

In 2002, Gabrilovich published a research paper documenting the possibility of an IDN homograph attack, with fellow researcher Alex Gontmakher. In 2005, Gabrilovich earned his PhD degree in Computer Science from the Technion – Israel Institute of Technology. In his Ph.D. thesis, he developed a methodology for using large scale repositories of world knowledge, such as Wikipedia, as a basis for improvement of text representations.

Publications

 "Computing Semantic Relatedness using Wikipedia-based Explicit Semantic Analysis", The 20th International Joint Conference on Artificial Intelligence (IJCAI), pp. 1606–1611, Evgeniy Gabrilovich and Shaul Markovitch, Hyderabad, India, January 2007
 "Harnessing the Expertise of 70,000 Human Editors: Knowledge-Based Feature Generation for Text Categorization", Evgeniy Gabrilovich and Shaul Markovitch, Journal of Machine Learning Research 8 (Oct), pp. 2297–2345, 2007
 "Robust Classification of Rare Queries Using Web Knowledge", The 30th Annual International ACM SIGIR Conference, Amsterdam, The Netherlands, July 2007
 The Homograph Attack , Evgeniy Gabrilovich and Alex Gontmakher, Communications of the ACM, 45(2):128, February 2002

References 

Living people
American computer scientists
Writers about computer security
Technion – Israel Institute of Technology alumni
Year of birth missing (living people)
Facebook employees
Fellow Members of the IEEE
Fellows of the Association for Computing Machinery